Clubic is a French web site, which was owned by M6 Web until March 2018, and is now independent.

Created in 2000, this webzine about computing and multimedia offers news, reviews and downloads of software applications, as well as community services. The web site integrates articles written by other web sites edited by Cyréalis such as JeuxVideo.fr, Mobinautes or NetEco. Cyréalis was bought by M6 in 2008. The editorial policy of Clubic is voluntarily geared towards the general public in order to reach a wide audience.

According to Alexa, as of 5 April 2009, Clubic is the 1,433 most visited website in the world, and the 79th in France. It has 4.3 million unique visitors each month, with 88 millions of pageviews per month.

References

External links
 Official website

2000 establishments in France
News magazines published in France
French-language magazines
French news websites
Magazines established in 2000
Online computer magazines
Magazines about the media